Brooks Stadium is a 21,000-seat multi-purpose stadium in Conway, South Carolina. It is home to the Coastal Carolina Chanticleers football team at Coastal Carolina University.  The facility opened in 2003 and is named in honor of Coby Garrett Brooks and Boni Belle Brooks, children of Robert Brooks.  Brooks was a Loris, South Carolina native and was the chairman of Hooters of America, Inc. The stadium is notable for its teal artificial turf.

History and renovation

While the current stadium dates only to 2003, the site has a considerably longer football history. In a 2020 interview, Coastal athletic director Matt Hogue, who began working at the school in 1997 as Coastal's basketball play-by-play announcer, told ESPN journalist Ryan McGee,

Groundbreaking for Brooks Stadium was held on July 30, 2002. Phase I of the stadium construction contained 6,408 seats, while the foundation and infrastructure of the stadium was designed to support future expansion to 20,000 seats. The stadium was formally dedicated on September 6, 2003, as the Chanticleer football team opened its inaugural game vs. Newberry College in front of a crowd of more than 8,000. On October 7, 2006, the field was named James C. Benton Field to honor the family for a large donation they made to the Coastal athletics program earlier in the year.

2017–19 expansion
 Following the announcement of the university joining the Sun Belt Conference on September 1, 2015, Brooks Stadium underwent construction to expand the stadium to 20,000 seats. The NCAA requires FBS programs to maintain an average attendance of at least 15,000 over a rolling two-year cycle. The expansion project received approval from the state in November 2015, but construction was not expected to begin until January 2017. Coastal Carolina University officials set the project price tag at $38 million.  The committee also announced in February 2017 the lead architects for the expansion were Heery International, Inc. architectural firm and Stubbs Muldrow Herin architects. McKnight Construction Company was awarded the project, and groundbreaking took place on March 21, 2017. Construction took place over two phases; the first phase expanded the stadium to the FBS-minimum 15,000 seats by expanding the sidelines and connecting them to the north end zone as well as expanding the press box side upper deck. It was completed in time for Coastal Carolina's season opener against UMass on September 2, 2017. Construction of phase II began in January 2018, and further expanded capacity to over 20,000 seats by adding premium seating and an upper deck to the west side. Phase II was finished in August 2019.

Marrio & Josh Norman Fieldhouse
 The $8.5 million fieldhouse opened at Brooks Stadium in June 2010. It was originally named for brothers Mark and Will Adkins (Coastal Carolina '89), who planned to donate $1.5 million to the project. The fieldhouse added 1,600 seats.

On November 3, 2018, it was announced that Josh Norman had donated a large amount of money to the athletic department and the Adkins Fieldhouse name changed to Marrio & Josh Norman Fieldhouse.

The Marrio & Josh Norman Fieldhouse also includes houses:
 Football offices, meeting rooms, and football locker room
  Strength & conditioning center for all student-athletes
 Men's and women's cross country and track & field offices
 Men's and women's soccer offices
 Men's and women's golf offices
 Men's tennis office
 Baseball office
 Softball office
 Sasser Athletic Hall of Fame

Attendance records

See also
 List of NCAA Division I FBS football stadiums

References

External links
 Brooks Stadium – Coastal Carolina Chanticleer Athletics

College football venues
Sports venues in South Carolina
Multi-purpose stadiums in the United States
Sports venues in Horry County, South Carolina
Buildings and structures in Conway, South Carolina
American football venues in South Carolina
2003 establishments in South Carolina
Sports venues completed in 2003
Coastal Carolina Chanticleers football
Coastal Carolina Chanticleers sports venues